The 59th Directors Guild of America Awards, honoring the outstanding directorial achievements in films, documentary and television in 2006, were presented on February 3, 2007, at the Hyatt Regency Century Plaza. The ceremony was hosted by Carl Reiner. On January 9, 2007, the nominees in the feature film category were announced and on January 10, 2007, the nominations in the television movie category were announced. The nominations for the remaining six television awards were announced on January 11, 2007, and the nominations for directorial achievement in documentaries and commercials were announced on January 16, 2007.

Winners and nominees

Film

Television

Commercials

Lifetime Achievement in News Direction
 George Paul

Robert B. Aldrich Service Award
 Paris Barclay
 Taylor Hackford

Franklin J. Schaffner Achievement Award
 Terence Benson

Honorary Life Member
 Carl Reiner

References

External links
 

Directors Guild of America Awards
2006 film awards
2006 guild awards
2006 television awards
2006 in American cinema
2006 in American television
Directors